Pattuthurai or Pattudurai is a village in Tamil Nadu state in India, located in the Thalaivasal mandal of the Salem district, two kilometres from Thalaivasal, one of the biggest panchayat unions in the Attur taluk.

Geography 

The area includes Sivasankarapuram, which is known for its poultry farms. Pattuthurai is the biggest poultry farm area in the Salem district. Eggs are exported to all areas of Tamil Nadu from here. Vasistanadhi (Vashista River) flows through the village from Salem, merging with the Cuddalore district rivers. A railway bridge near the Mariamman Temple has proved useful for villagers crossing the river.

Thalaivasal, Navakkurichi, Manivizhundan, Deviyakkurichi are the borders of the village. Siruvachur, Unathur, Veppanatham, Ponnoli Nagar, etc. are nearby hamlets.

Demographics 

The village has a literacy rate of 40% to 50%. Most villagers cannot afford higher education, but some of the younger people study in colleges across the state.

Most families in the village are from the lower and middle classes, but vehicles, TVs, and radios are readily affordable to them. Some live in rented houses, but many own their houses and farmlands.

The predominant religion here is Hindu, but there are a few Christians and very few Muslims.

Education 
Pattuthurai has one library and a government operated high school. Many children from Pattuthurai study in this school. Tours are arranged for children every year studying in school. And there is a playground not only for pupils but also for other children in the village.

Transport

Buses 
 Number 12 is a government bus that goes to Unathur and Attur through this village.
 Ravikumar Transport is a private bus to Unathur and Attur by the way of this village.
 Number 34 to Ponnolinagar and Attur runs through this village.
 Number 10 and Number 17 to Attur and Thalaivasal go through many small hamlets.
 Jayam mini bus is available from Thalaivasal - Unathur - Ponnolinagar. 

The village is serviced by the Thalaivasal Railway Station. This station is less than one kilometer from Pattuthurai. Trains to Chennai, Salem, Viruthachalam, and Melmaruvathur are available here. Chennai Express does not stop at this station.

Temples 
River Mariamman temple / Pudhupatti Mariamman, which is one of the popular temples for surrounding villages. The chariot-pulling ceremony is popular. But for the last ten years there have been problems.
Mariamman, Vinayagar, Perumal temples are inside of the village.
Selliamman Templef, Karuppaiyya Temple are in the west corner of this village.
And there are smaller villages within this village.

Economy 

Most of the villagers are farmers. Some are agricultural labourers, and a few work outside of India as labourers in Dubai, Saudi Arabia, Malaysia and Singapore. A few have traveled to the United States. People own tractors, paddy harvesters, trucks, lorries, and maize grinders.

Maize, paddy, sugarcane, tapioca, and turmeric are the main cultivated plants. Maize is the most important crop. For more see Thalaivasal on wiki.

There are two lathe and welding workshops located in the village. A cycle puncture and repair shop is also available here. A farm trading building is here. Three more department and grocery stores are also available in this village.

Administration and politics 

It is a village in Thalaivasal union and Kallakurichi Lok Sabha constituency.

The Government buildings in the village include:
 School building
 VAO Office
 Panchayat office
 Milk store
 Ration store
 Post office

References 

Villages in Salem district